This is a list of islands of Latvia.  There are over 40 islands (sala in Latvian) in Latvia, including the following:

Ābeļu Salas
Andreja Sala, 
Anna Sala, 
Apšu Sala (Ežezerā)
Apšu Sala (Lake Rāzna)
Artura Island, 
Atteku Sala, 
Auzu Sala, 
Bieķiņa Sala, 
Bridas Sala,  
Bulllu Sala (Daugavgrīvas Sala), 
Doles Sala (peninsula), 
Gulbju Sala, 
Kazas Sēklis
Ķīpsala (Kip Island), 
Krūmiņsala
Kolka Lighthouse (Artificial island), 
Krievu Sala, 
Kundziņsala (Kundzin Island), 
Kurpnieku Sala (peninsula), 
Lielā Sala, 
Lielā Alkšņu Sala, 
Lielā Iļķeniešu Sala,  
Lielalksnīte,  
Liepu Sala,  
Lucavsala, 
Mazā Sala, 
Mazā Zirgu Sala, 
Mazalksnīte, 
Mazā Vējzaķu Sala, 
Mērsala, 
Mīlestības Saliņa, 
Moricsala, 
Muižas Sala,  
Mūku Sala, 
Nāves Sala, 
Peldu Sala, 
Pērssala,  
Pils Sala
Priežu Sala, 
Putnu Sala, 
Ropažu Sala, 
Rutku Sala (Iļķēnsala)
Sakas Sala (Vidsala)
Sniķera Sala
Sudrabsaliņa
Vadoņa Sala, 
Vējzaķa Sala, 
Viskūžu Sala, 
Zaķusala (Hare Island), 
Zirgu Sala,

See also 
List of islands in the Baltic Sea
List of islands

References

 List
Latvia
Islands